The Ministry of Agriculture, Fisheries and Food (MAPA), is the department of the Government of Spain responsible for proposing and carrying out the government policy on agricultural, livestock and fishery resources, food industry, rural development and human food. The Ministry is responsible for assigning Veterinary Surgeons to carry out checks in regard to the issuing of REGA Licences (Registro de Explotación) a requirement for the ownership of horses on Spanish property and small holdings.

Specifically, it corresponds to the MAPA the preparation of State legislation on agriculture, fisheries and food; the proposal and carrying out of the general guidelines of the Government on agricultural, fisheries and food policies; the representation of Spain in the international organizations corresponding to these matters; as well as the coordination of actions, cooperation and agreement in the design and application of all policies that affect the scope of competences of the autonomous communities and the other public administrations, encouraging their participation through the cooperation bodies and instruments adequate.

Unlike most ministries, this one has not any Secretariat of State and it works through three bodies with the rank of Undersecretariat: the General Secretariat for Agriculture and Food, the General Secretariat for Fisheries and the Undersecretariat of the Ministry. The head of the Department is the Minister of Agriculture, currently Mr. Luis Planas.

History

Early period

From the beginning of the 19th century, it is worth mentioning that under the reign of Ferdinand VII, the work of promoting agriculture were carried out by the Ministry of Finance or the field of livestock, under the authority of the Council of the Mesta.

The Royal Decree of 9 November 1832 created the Secretariat of State and the Dispatch of General Development of the Realm and which had among its responsibilities the promotion of agriculture, nurseries and breeding cattle, gardening and conservation of mountains and trees or hunting and fishing. For this, it was made dependent on the Ministry the Department for Forestry Conservation and the Honorable Council of the Mesta.

The agriculture responsibilities remained in the Ministry of Development for nearly one hundred years. In 1870 there was already a Directorate-General for Public Works and Agriculture.

Finally, in 1900, after the split of Education, the Development Ministry was suppressed and the Ministry of Agriculture, Industry, Commerce and Public Works was created to assume the rest of the responsibilities. However, five years later the Ministry of Agriculture is suppressed and the Ministry of Development recovered.

With the approval of Royal Decree of 3 November 1928, the Ministry of National Economy was created, to which the Directorate-General for Agriculture was transferred along with the agricultural chambers, the agronomic council and the association of Cattle Ranchers and the services of Hygiene and Livestock Health.

Late period
By Decree of 16 December 1931, the President of the Republic Niceto Alcalá Zamora re-created the Ministry, incorporating the Directorate-General for Agriculture, Industry and Commerce, from the Ministry of National Economy, and the Directorate-General for Mines and Fuels, the Directorate-General for Forestry, Fishing and Hunting and the Directorate-General for Livestock, from the Ministry of Development.

As happened with the Ministry of Development, in 1933 the Ministry was divided into two: the Ministry of Agriculture and the Ministry of Industry and Commerce. It was the first time that there was a Ministry dedicated exclusively to managing the agricultural affairs. The separation became final, except in the period from 25 September 1935 to 19 February 1936, when it assumed again the responsibilities of industry and trade.

The next big change would be made in 1981, when the ministry assumed the competencies on fisheries and was called Ministry of Agriculture, Fisheries and Food until 2008 when prime minister José Luis Rodríguez Zapatero merged it with the Environment Ministry and was renamed Ministry of the Environment and Rural and Marine Affairs.

The new government of Mariano Rajoy renamed the department in 2011 as Ministry of Agriculture, Food and Environment and since 2016 as Ministry of Agriculture and Fisheries, Food and Environment. In 2018, new prime minister Pedro Sánchez created again the Ministry of Environment and this ministry recovered the 1981-2008 denomination. In 2020, the ministry lost its powers on forestry.

Structure
The Ministry of Agriculture, Fisheries and Food is organised in the following bodies:

The General Secretariat for Agriculture and Food
The Directorate-General for Agricultural Production and Markets
The Directorate-General for Health of Agricultural Production
The Directorate-General for Rural Development, Innovation and Agrifood Training
The Directorate-General for the Food Industry
The Deputy Directorate-General for Support and Coordination
The Deputy Directorate-General for Agricultural Policy Planning
The General Secretariat for Fisheries
The Directorate-General for Sustainable Fisheries
The Directorate-General for Fisheries Management and Aquaculture
The Deputy Directorate-General for Management
The Deputy Directorate-General for Legal Affairs and International Fisheries Governance
The Undersecretariat of Agriculture, Fisheries and Food
The Technical General Secretariat
The Directorate-General for Services and Inspection
The Deputy Directorate-General for Analysis, Coordination and Statistics
The Deputy Directorate-General for International Relations and European Union Affairs.

In addition, the department has four autonomous agencies:

The Food Information and Control Agency (AICA)
The Spanish Agricultural Guarantee Fund (FEGA)
The National Agency for Agricultural Insurance (ENESA)
The Junta Nacional de Homologación de Trofeos de Caza (JNHTC)

List of Ministers of Agriculture
This are the ministers since 1931, to see the Ministers between 1900 and 1905 see Ministry of Development (Spain)#List of Ministers.

(1) Ministry of Agriculture
(2) Ministry of Agriculture, Industry and Commerce.
(3) Ministry of Industry, Commerce and Agriculture.
(4) Ministry of Agriculture and Agro Labour
(5) Ministry of Agriculture and Labour
(6) Ministry of Agriculture and Fisheries
(7) Ministry of the Environment, Rural and Marine Affairs
(8) Ministry of Agriculture, Food and Environment
(9) Ministry of Agriculture and Fisheries, Food and Environment

References

Spanish Cabinets at CSIC website

External links
Official website 

 
Environment, Rural And Marine Affairs
Spain
Spain
Spain
Forestry in Spain
Government ministries of Spain
Food safety organizations
Regulation in Spain
Agricultural organisations based in Spain